The Dualers are an eight-piece (or nine-piece) ska and reggae band from South East London. Initially comprising brothers Si and Tyber Cranstoun, and now led by Tyber following Si's departure in 2010 for a solo career, they first developed a profile when the single "Kiss on the Lips" entered the UK top 30, peaking at 21, in October 2004 despite no industry backing.

The Dualers have supported Madness at their large outdoor concerts and played headline gigs at Indigo O2, Fairfield Halls in Croydon and the Churchill Theatre in Bromley.

History
The Dualers started out in 1999 as a busking duo of Si Christone and Tyber O'Neil (brothers Simon David Cranstoun and Jonathan Lloyd Cranstoun) who could be found on the streets of Bromley, Canterbury, Croydon, Kingston and Romford playing a mix of doo-wop, pop and ska.

By 2004, an old school friend called David Ellis reckoned that the brothers must have played to thousands of people on the streets of these towns, so much so, that they would have a big enough fanbase to release a single. Ellis set up a record label with the brothers called Galley Music and persuaded local Virgin and HMV shops stock a record by the pair called "Kiss on the Lips". 6,000 singles were pressed up by Galley Music, with enough being sold in the local area for the record to chart in the Top 40 of the Official Charts Company's Singles Chart, on a week where they could be still be seen busking outside the Liberty Music Shop in Romford.

In 2005, the duo signed to  Guy Holmes' Gut Records label and scored another Top 40 hit with "Truly Madly Deeply".

In 2010 Si Cranstoun decided to embark on a solo career, with The Dualers expanding to become a nine-piece ska band.

In 2019, The Dualers scored their first OCC Album Chart hit after selling 4,229 copies of their Palm Trees And 80 Degrees album to reach No.11. In 2022, Voices from the Sun became their second hit album, with a weekly sale of 2,789 album getting them a number 26 chart debut.

Discography

Albums
Vintage Versions Volume I – Sandcamel Records
Vintage Versions Volume II – Galley Music
Rhymes & Rhythms – Galley Music
The Melting Pot – Galley Music
Get Festive Volume 1 – Galley Music
Upbeat Sounds – Galley Music
The Very Best of Vintage Versions – Galley Music
The Cooking Pot – Galley Music
The Summer of Ska – Live at the Indigo July 22nd 2010
With Respect 
Prince Buster Shakedown – Phoenix City a division of Cherry Red Records Ltd
Rewind
Back to Paradise – Sunbeat Records
Reggae Street
Live at Indigo 2nd December 2015
Reggae Street 2
Palm Trees and 80 Degrees (2019, Sunbeat Records) – No. 11 UK
Voices from the Sun (2022)

DVD
The Dualers – Documentary DVD 2006
The Dualers – Documentary Reissued DVD 2010
The Summer of Ska – Live at the Indigo2 July 22nd 2010

Singles

References

External links
Official Dualers Website

English buskers
English ska musical groups
Musical groups from London